Business operations is the harvesting of value from assets owned by a business. Assets can be either physical or intangible. An example of value derived from a physical asset, like a building, is rent. An example of value derived from an intangible asset, like an idea, is a royalty. The effort involved in "harvesting" this value is what constitutes business operations cycles.

Overview 
Business operations encompass three fundamental management imperatives that collectively aim to maximize value harvested from business assets (this has often been referred to as "sweating the assets"):

 Generate recurring income
 Increase the value of the business assets
 Secure the income and value of the business

The three imperatives are interdependent. The following basic tenets illustrate this interdependency:
 The more recurring income an asset generates, the more valuable it becomes. 
For example, the products that sell at the highest volumes and prices are usually considered to be the most valuable products in a business’s product portfolio.
 The more valuable a product becomes the more recurring income it generates. 
For example, a luxury car can be leased out at a higher rate than a normal car.
 The intrinsic value and income-generating potential of an asset cannot be realized without a way to secure it. 
For example, petroleum deposits are worthless unless processes and equipment are developed and employed to extract, refine, and distribute it profitably.

The business model of a business describes the means by which the three management imperatives are achieved. In this sense, business operations is the execution of the business model.

Business operations topics

Generating recurring income 
This is the most straightforward and well-understood management imperative of business operations. The primary goal of this imperative is to implement a sustained delivery of goods and services to the business's customers at a cost that is less than the funds acquired in exchange for said goods and also self-employee services—in short, making a profit.

 The funds directly acquired by the business in exchange for the goods and services it delivers is the business's revenue.

 The cost of developing, producing, and delivering these goods and services is the business's expenses.

A business whose revenues are sufficiently greater than its expenses makes profit or income. Such a business is profitable. As such, generating recurring "revenue" is not the focus of operations management; what counts is management of the relationship between the cost of goods sold and the revenue derived from their sale. Efficient processes that reduce costs even while prices remain the same expand the gap between revenue and expenses and derive higher profitability.

Types of recurring income:
 Long-term sales contracts: monthly to yearly based contracts for service or product;
Examples: mobile phone contracts/plans.
 Multiple revenue streams: different sources of business income that support each other;
Examples: sell printers and toners.

Increasing the Value of the Business 
The more profitable a business is, the more valuable it is. A business's profitability is measured on the basis of how much income it generates for the:
 Amount of assets its business operations employ—its business return.
 amount of revenue it realizes — its business margin.

Methods of increasing value

Growth strategies 
 Expand market: offer a product or service to a wider section of an existing market or to a new demographic, psychographic or geographic market.
 Develop brand: a recognized, respected and developed brand is highly valuable. Develop through research, design and marketing of companies name, logo and tagline.

Management systems 
 Show growth potential: create a business that has potential to be efficiently expanded;
Example: developing an efficient business system and operating manuals allows the business to potentially be franchised or licensed.
 Maintain intangible assets: Maintaining intangible assets can protect elements that add value to a business;
Examples: patenting, copyrighting or trademarking anything believed to be an intangible asset.
 Protect and maintain physical assets: protecting physical assets will also help protect the overall value;
Examples: regular maintenance and insuring viable physical assets.

Securing the income and value of the business 
 Desirability or demand for its goods and services
 Ability of its customers to pay for its goods and services
 Uniqueness and competitiveness of its business model
 Control exerted over the quality and efficiency of production activities
 Public regard for the business as a member of the community

A business that can harvest a significant amount of value from its assets but cannot demonstrate an ability to sustain this effort cannot be considered a viable business.

References

Business terms
Business process